Boselewa is a small Austronesian language spoken in the D'Entrecasteaux Islands of Papua New Guinea.

References 

Nuclear Papuan Tip languages
Languages of Milne Bay Province
D'Entrecasteaux Islands
Vulnerable languages